Ludwigia (primrose-willow, water-purslane, or water-primrose) is a genus of about 82 species of aquatic plants native to Central and South America with a cosmopolitan but mainly tropical distribution.

At current, there is much debate among botanists and plant taxonomists as to the classification of many Ludwigia species.  Botanists from the US Department of Agriculture are currently doing genetic analyses on plants from the Western US and South America to better classify members of this genus.

The genus was named by Carl Linnaeus after Christian Gottlieb Ludwig (1709-1773), a German botanist, who was apparently not amused by this honour.

Fossil record 
A large number of fossil seeds of †Ludwigia collinsoniae and †L. corneri  have been described from middle Miocene strata of the Fasterholt area near Silkeborg in Central Jutland, Denmark.

Selected species 
Listed from the NCBI database:

 Ludwigia adscendens
 Ludwigia alata
 Ludwigia alternifolia
 Ludwigia anastomosans
 Ludwigia arcuata
 Ludwigia bonariensis
 Ludwigia brevipes
 Ludwigia curtissii
 Ludwigia decurrens
 Ludwigia erecta
 Ludwigia glandulosa
 Ludwigia grandiflora
 Ludwigia helminthorrhiza
 Ludwigia hirtella
 Ludwigia hexapetala
 Ludwigia hyssopifolia
 Ludwigia inclinata
 Ludwigia lanceolata
 Ludwigia leptocarpa
 Ludwigia linearis
 Ludwigia linifolia
 Ludwigia longifolia
 Ludwigia maritima
 Ludwigia microcarpa
 Ludwigia natans
 Ludwigia octovalvis
 Ludwigia palustris
 Ludwigia peploides
 Ludwigia peruviana
 Ludwigia pilosa
 Ludwigia polycarpa
 Ludwigia ravenii
 Ludwigia repens
 Ludwigia sedioides
 Ludwigia simpsonii
 Ludwigia spathulata
 Ludwigia sphaerocarpa
 Ludwigia suffruticosa
 Ludwigia virgata

References 

 Wagner, W. L., Hoch, P. C., & Raven, P. H. (2007). Revised classification of the Onagraceae. Systematic Botany Monographs, 83.

External links 

 
Onagraceae genera
Taxa named by Carl Linnaeus